San Felipe is a corregimiento within Panama City, in Panamá District, Panamá Province, Panama with a population of 3,262 as of 2010. Its population as of 1990 was 10,282; its population as of 2000 was 6,928.

References

Corregimientos of Panamá Province
Panamá District